The 1906–07 IPHL season was played by teams of the International Professional Hockey League.

Final standings

References
Is Pittsburgh the Birthplace of Professional Hockey? The early years of hockey 1900-1910 Compiled by Ernie Fitzsimmons

International Professional Hockey League seasons
IPHL
IPHL